Romasanta, also known as  in Spanish, and Romasanta: The Werewolf Hunt in English, is a 2004 Spanish-Italian-British horror film directed by Paco Plaza and starring Julian Sands, Elsa Pataky and John Sharian.  It is available on DVD from Lion's Gate Entertainment under the title Werewolf Hunt.

Based on a script by Alfredo Conde, according to the end credits the film is based on a true story, that of Manuel Blanco Romasanta, Spain’s first documented serial killer. Conde is a descendant of one of the doctors involved the original Werewolf of Allariz court case that took place in 1853/54 in Galicia, Spain. He went on to write a fictional novel, The Uncertain Memoirs of a Galician Wolfman: Romasanta. The same case previously provided the basis for the 1968 Spanish film El bosque del lobo ("The Wolf's Forest").

Plot

The story takes place in 1851 in a small Spanish village apparently plagued by what we would now call a serial killer, as corpses are discovered bearing both savage mutilation and precise surgical incisions. Clues point toward Manuel Romasanta, who confesses to the crimes, but claims that he is a victim of lycanthropy. A scientist, Professor Philips, argues that Romasanta suffers not from a supernatural curse but from a mental disorder.

Cast
Julian Sands as Manuel Romasanta
Elsa Pataky as Barbara
John Sharian as Antonio
David Gant as Professor Philips
Gary Piquer as District Attorney Luciano de la Bastida
Maru Valdivielso as Maria
Luna McGill as Teresa
Carlos Reig-Plaza as Gomez
Ivana Baquero as Ana

Reception

Critical response

Jonathan Holland of Variety commended the film for its cinematography, visual and audio effects, as well as Sands' and Pataky's performances; but felt that the romance was underdeveloped, stating that the script covered too much ground and lacked "dramatic focus". Jon Condit of Dread Central rated the film a score of four out of five, offering similar praise, also commending its gothic atmosphere and historical and scientific context, while criticizing the film's slow pacing. Cinema Crazeds Felix Vasquez gave the film a mostly positive review,  calling it  "a grim, bleak, and original peak into the rare disease of lycanthropy, and posits a new take on the werewolf genre; while noting the film's plot holes, and 'confusing' characterizations. AllMovie's Jeremy Wheeler praised the film's cinematography, production values, special effects, and performances.

Awards 
Romasanta was nominated for a number of Spanish awards, including two Goya Awards (Best Cinematography and Best Special Effects) and two Barcelona Film Awards (Best Film Editing and Best New Director).

References

External links
 
 
 

2004 films
2004 horror films 
2004 psychological thriller films 
British slasher films 
Spanish slasher films 
Italian slasher films 
Gothic horror films
English-language Italian films
English-language Spanish films
Spanish werewolf films 
British serial killer films 
Films set in the 1850s
Films set in Spain
Horror films based on actual events
Supernatural slasher films
Films directed by Paco Plaza
British werewolf films
2000s English-language films
2000s British films
2000s Spanish films